Graham Jarvis is a Canadian former international lawn bowler.

He won the pairs silver medal at the 1980 World Outdoor Bowls Championship in Frankston, Victoria with bowls partner Burnie Gill.

He won the pairs silver medal at the 1987 Asia Pacific Bowls Championships in Lae, Papua New Guinea.

References

Canadian male bowls players
Living people
Year of birth missing (living people)